Haematopota pseudolusitanica is a species of horse fly in the family Tabanidae.

Distribution
Portugal, Spain, France, Morocco.

References

Tabanidae
Insects described in 1923
Diptera of Europe
Taxa named by Zoltán Szilády